Safari is a monthly science and general knowledge magazine published in Gujarati and English language, by Harshal Publications, Ahmedabad in Gujarat, India. It is editor and publisher is  Nagendra Vijay.

History
Safari Magazine was first published on 1 August 1980 by Nagendra Vijay. It was the first magazine of its kind from Gujarat. After its sixth issue, its publishing was closed. It was relaunched in July 1986. Again, after tenth issue, its publishing was closed. Finally, in May 1992, the magazine was relaunched again, and since then, it has continued.

Harshal Publications is a publishing house, known for its informative books and periodicals that educate and enhance creative thinking in younger generation.

Safari launched its English edition in 2008 which is available in most parts of India. It was stopped in 2015.

Content
Apart from popular science articles, the magazine also contains articles on history, current affairs, hobbies and defense matters. It is a very popular magazine among young children, students as well as elders. The tagline of the magazine reads "બુદ્ધિશાળી વાચકો માટે નું મેગેઝીન" meaning "A magazine for intelligent readers". History is featured under the title "એક વખત એવું બન્યું " (Once upon a time). The magazine features puzzles ranging from easy to difficult, quiz, quick facts(titled in magazine as fact-finder and Super-quiz) as well as jokes. It also updates the knowledge of readers by the Section 'નવું સંશોધન' means 'New Research'. It is considered as one of the best magazines in Gujarati language, in terms of popularity and quality of content.

Reception
The magazine got mixed reception by the public. While at limited circulation in Gujarat and Maharashtra, where general public interest is in economic and current affairs, the magazine struggled in initial years of publication. Over the years it is praised for delivering quality content and now it is the only monthly science magazine published by private sector in India.

References

External links
Official website

Gujarati-language magazines
Monthly magazines published in India
Science and technology magazines published in India
Magazines established in 1980
Science and technology in Gujarat
1980 establishments in Gujarat